Yên Khánh is a rural district of Ninh Bình province in the Red River Delta region of Vietnam. As of 2003 the district had a population of 141,471. The district covers an area of 142 km². The district capital lies at Yên Ninh.

References

Districts of Ninh Bình province